Los Angeles Uprising may refer to:

 Watts riots in 1965
 1992 Los Angeles riots